Equalized odds, also referred to as conditional procedure accuracy equality and disparate mistreatment, is a measure of fairness in machine learning. A classifier satisfies this definition if the subjects in the protected and unprotected groups have equal true positive rate and equal false positive rate, satisfying the formula:

For example,  could be gender, race, and other characteristics that we want to be free of bias, while  would be whether the person is qualified for the degree, and the output  would be the school's decision whether to offer the person to study for the degree. In this context, higher university enrollment rates of African Americans compared to whites with similar test scores may also fulfill the condition of Equalized odds.

Originally, the concept is defined for binary class. In 2017, Woodworth et al. generalized the concept further for multiple classes.

See also
Fairness (machine learning)
Color blindness (racial classification)

References

Machine learning
Information ethics
Computing and society
Philosophy of artificial intelligence
Discrimination
Bias